Mount Skook Davidson, is a mountain in the Kechika Ranges of the Cassiar Mountains in far northern British Columbia, Canada. It overlooks the "Diamond J Ranch", which was founded by John Ogilvie Davidson also known as "Skook" Davidson or "Skookum" Davidson because of his stature (big and strong, see skookum). Davidson was a notable local pioneer who worked as a land surveyor before taking up packing, guiding, and ranching in this area.  He helped discover and select the route for the Alaska Highway.

See also
List of Chinook Jargon placenames

Prominence
Its topographic prominence is 1361m above its col at Denetiah Lake.

References

Two-thousanders of British Columbia
Liard Country
Cassiar Mountains
Cassiar Land District